Verkhneyablochny is a rural locality (a khutor) in Nizhneyablochnoye Rural Settlement, Kotelnikovsky District, Volgograd Oblast, Russia. The population was 336 as of 2010. There are 5 streets.

Geography 
Verkhneyablochny is located in steppe, 24 km north of Kotelnikovo (the district's administrative centre) by road. Nizhneyablochny is the nearest rural locality.

References 

Rural localities in Kotelnikovsky District